Bjurälven is a river in Jämtland, Sweden. The river is partially underground and has a famous cave area.

References

External links
Bjurälven reserve 
Bjurälven, sveriges längsta undervattensgrotta 

Rivers of Jämtland County
Sinking rivers